LHD can mean:

 Landing helicopter dock, a US Navy hull classification symbol for multipurpose amphibious assault ships of the Wasp class.
 Large Helical Device, a major Japanese nuclear fusion reactor.
 Leatherhead railway station, Surrey, England, by National Rail station code
 Left hand drive, a vehicle with the driving controls mounted on the left side of the cabin. Used in most countries where traffic travels on the right-hand side of the road.
 Liechtenstein Homeland Service, a defunct corporatist party in Liechtenstein.
 Limburgse Handbal Dagen, a handball tournament in Limburg.
 Linear heat detection, a type of fire alarm system utilized in tunnels and special hazards.
 Litterarum Humanarum Doctor, Latin for Doctor of Humane Letters, an honorary academic degree for persons with significant accomplishments in fields other than science.
 Load, haul, dump machine, a vehicle used in underground mining.
 Local health department, government agencies in the United States.
 Doctor of Humane Letters, an honorary academic degree